Iveagh Lower, Lower Half is the name of a barony in County Down, Northern Ireland. It was created by 1851 with the division of the barony of Iveagh Lower into two. It is bordered by six other baronies: Massereene Upper to the north; Castlereagh Upper to the east; Iveagh Lower, Upper Half and Iveagh Upper, Upper Half to the south; Oneilland East and Orior Lower to the west.

List of settlements
Below is a list of settlements in Iveagh Upper, Lower Half:

Towns
Dromore

Villages
Corbet
Dromara
Kinallen
Waringstown

List of civil parishes
Below is a list of civil parishes in Iveagh Lower, Lower Half:
Aghaderg (two townlands, rest in baronies of Iveagh Upper, Lower Half and Iveagh Upper, Upper Half)
Annahilt (also partly in barony of Kinelarty (one townland))
Dromara (also partly in baronies of Iveagh Upper, Lower Half and Kinelarty)
Dromore (also partly in barony of Iveagh Lower, Upper Half (one townland))
Drumgooland (also partly in barony of Iveagh Upper, Lower Half (one townland))
Garvaghy (also partly in barony of Iveagh Upper, Lower Half)
Magheradrool (one townland, rest in barony of Kinelarty)
Magherally (one  townland in barony of Iveagh Lower, Upper Half) 
Seapatrick (also partly in baronies of Iveagh Upper, Upper Half and Iveagh Lower, Upper Half)
Tullylish (also partly in barony of Iveagh Lower, Upper Half)

References